The Community Museum Laboratory (CML) was a student-run experimental art space in Indianapolis, Indiana dedicated to exploring connections between art and community that was open from 2006 to 2009. It was a project of the Herron School of Art and Design  initiated by Eric Nordgulen who negotiated the free use of an empty building in the arts district Fountain Square with Sandor Development, a local real estate company.  They hosted participatory exhibitions that engaged the public through experiments in reciprocity, exchange in dialogue and were influenced by (while skeptical of) the tradition of Relational Aesthetics.

Select exhibitions and projects 
 Super Rad Awesome Explosion
 Copy:Copy: a collaborative event with Big Car Gallery, PostSecret, and Found Magazine
 CML Sapphire Edition
 Off Procession: staged in conjunction with the project On Procession, curated by Fritz Haeg at the Indianapolis Museum of Art.

References 

Art and design organizations
Fountain Square, Indianapolis
Culture of Indianapolis